Susan Lloyd-Hurwitz is an Australian businesswoman and chief executive working in real estate funds management and property development. In 2014 she was named New South Wales Business Woman of the Year as well as Telstra Business Woman of the Year for the private and corporate sector.

Life
Lloyd-Hurwitz holds a Bachelor of Arts (Hons) from the University of Sydney and completed an MBA (Distinction) from INSEAD, France in 1994.

Lloyd-Hurwitz has held the position of managing director at LaSalle Investment Management as well as senior positions at MGPA, Macquarie Group and Lend Lease Corporation, and worked in Australia, the US and Europe. In 2012 she was appointed chief executive officer and managing director of the real estate company Mirvac. In February 2021 she joined the board of the Business Council of Australia.

References

Living people
Year of birth missing (living people)
University of Sydney alumni
Australian women chief executives
20th-century Australian women
21st-century Australian women
21st-century Australian people
INSEAD alumni
People educated at Abbotsleigh